Martin Lauchlan (born 1 October 1980) is a Scottish football manager and former professional footballer who is currently manager of West of Scotland League club Petershill. He played for several clubs in the Scottish Premier League and Scottish Football League, including Partick Thistle, St Johnstone and Stenhousemuir.

Playing career
Lauchlan came through the youth system at Partick Thistle and made his debut for the club against Morton in January 1998. In spite of injury affecting his early development at Thistle, Lauchlan moved to St Johnstone in July 1999, for an initial fee of £45,000. The midfielder made six Premier League appearances in his four years at Saints, all as substitute, and spent time on loan at Dumbarton. Released by St Johnstone in July 2003, he joined Stenhousemuir then later played for Irish side Finn Harps and Elgin City before dropping to Junior level with Bellshill Athletic, Petershill, Vale of Clyde and Shettleston.

Managerial career
Lauchlan joined Forth Wanderers as assistant manager in August 2012 and later occupied a similar role at Wishaw Juniors. He became a manager in his own right when appointed Rossvale boss in July 2014 and led the club to their first honour in the Junior game by winning the 2014–15 Central District Second Division title .

On 28 February 2016, Lauchlan resigned as manager of Rossvale. He was then appointed manager of Lowland Football League outfit East Kilbride. In his first season, East Kilbride won the 2016–17 Lowland Football League. East Kilbride progressed to the promotion/relegation playoff final, but missed out on promotion when they lost a penalty shootout against Cowdenbeath. He left the club at the end of the season, having won four trophies during fourteen months in charge.

Lauchlan joined Strathclyde University as their first team manager in August 2017. He returned to Petershill as manager in August 2019.

Lauchlan represented Scotland at youth level during his spell at Partick Thistle. He is the brother of fellow professional footballer Jim Lauchlan.

References

External links 

1980 births
Living people
Sportspeople from Rutherglen
Scottish footballers
Partick Thistle F.C. players
St Johnstone F.C. players
Stenhousemuir F.C. players
Elgin City F.C. players
Bellshill Athletic F.C. players
Petershill F.C. players
Scottish football managers
Scottish Football League players
Scottish Junior Football Association players
Dumbarton F.C. players
Finn Harps F.C. players
Association football midfielders
Scottish Junior Football Association managers
Footballers from Glasgow
East Kilbride F.C. managers
Rossvale F.C. managers
Petershill F.C. managers
Lowland Football League managers